Karen E. Frey is an American Earth scientist at Clark University who specializes in polar science, climate change, permafrost hydrology, and sea-ice variability. Frey also studies changes in the biogeochemistry of rivers, estuaries, and oceans in polar regions.

Early life and education
Frey completed her Bachelor of Arts in Geological Sciences from Cornell University in 1998 before enrolling at University of California, Los Angeles to complete her Master’s degree in Geography in 2000. Then, Frey earned her PhD in Geography specializing in arctic science and biogeochemistry from the University of California, Los Angeles in 2005.

Career 
Upon completing her PhD, Frey joined the faculty at The College of William and Mary in 2006 as a visiting assistant professor who taught GIS and environmental sciences classes. In 2007, Frey joined the faculty at the Graduate School of Geography at Clark University as an assistant professor. Frey was the project co-leader on several studies, including the Woodwell Polaris Project, the National Science Foundation Distributed Biological Observatory, and NASA ICESCAPE project. In 2005, Frey and her colleagues published the seminal paper, “Amplified carbon release from vast West Siberian peatlands by 2100” in Geophysical Research Letters, which reported climate model simulations for the next century and predicted near doubling dissolve organic carbon increases in streams and fluxes to the Arctic Ocean. This paper has been featured on Discovery Channel and the Earth Magazine.

Awards 
Frey is the Vice-Chair of the Marine Working Group of the International Arctic Science Committee. She has served as the chair of the International Arctic Science Committee that determines the recipient of the award each year. In addition, Frey has led the Arctic Ocean Primary Productivity Arctic Report Card since 2014.

References

External links 

American women earth scientists

Climate change

20th-century births

Living people

Year of birth missing (living people)